Sven Andersson (born 6 November 1932) is a retired Swedish ice hockey player. Andersson was part of the Djurgården Swedish champions' team of 1954.

References

External links

1932 births
Swedish ice hockey defencemen
Djurgårdens IF Hockey players
Living people